Metropolis Records is a record label founded in Philadelphia, Pennsylvania in 1993 by the late Dave Heckman. The label's all-electronic format closely tracked with European contemporaries, such as Off Beat, and, since 1995, has been instrumental in promoting and distributing underground electronic music in America.

On June 9, 1999, Metropolis bought American industrial label Pendragon. It assumed distribution responsibilities for the back catalogues of Pendragon, as well as of label 21st Circuitry that went out of business at the time.

Artists signed

References

External links 
 Official site

Electronic music record labels
American independent record labels
Record labels established in 1995
Industrial record labels
Goth record labels